July 15, 1972 is the second album by Taj Mahal Travellers.  It was recorded live at the Sogetsu Hall in Tokyo, Japan on July 15, 1972.

Track listing

Personnel
 Takehisa Kosugi - electronic violin, vocals and radio oscillators
 Ryo Koike - electronic contrabass, santur, sheet iron, and harmonica
 Yukio Tsuchiya - vibraphone, 
 Michihiro Kimura - electronic guitar & percussion
 Seiji Nagai - electronic trumpet, harmonica, castanets
 Tokio Hasegawa - vocals
 Hideo Yamashita - cover illustration

References

External links
  at Rate Your Music

1972 live albums